Raghunandan Panshikar (born 1963) is a Hindustani classical vocalist. He has received training in the Jaipur gharana Panshikar has established his own unique treatment to classical singing under tutelage of Kishori Aamonkar, which diverted from traditional Jaipur-Atrauli Gharana. A versatile artist, he sings semi classical forms like Bhajans, Thumris, Gazals and Natya Sangeet with panache. Recipient of several prestigious awards,Panshikar has made his mark in performances throughout India as well as in Europe, the United States and the Middle east.

Early life
Panshikar was born into a family of Sanskrit scholars and classical musicians. He is the son of the eminent Marathi stage actor and producer Prabhakar Panshikar. Panshikar's aptitude for music was recognized and fostered from an early age. He began his formal study of music in Mumbai at the age of eleven. He learned music from the late Vasantrao Kulkarni for two years. Later he took training from the doyen of Jaipur gharana, Kishori Amonkar from the age of 17, over next 20–22 years. During this time, Raghunandan had the rare fortune to be guided by Kishori Tai’s mother, Mogubai Kurdikar.

Career

Awards
 Smt.Manik Varma Puraskar 
 Upadhye Smriti Puraskar for contribution in Indian Classical Music
 He has been awarded by Swaryogini Dr. Prabha Atre award from Gaanvardhan & Tatyasaheb Natu foundation Pune, for his significant achievements and performing career.

Achievements
 (Best Music Direction)For The Musical Drama 'Avgha Rang Ekachi Zala'
 Z Gaurav Puraskar 
 Ma.Taa.(Maharashtra Times) Sanman 
 An Award from Maharashtra State 
 Ramkrishnabua Vaze Puraskar

See also
 Kishori Amonkar

Footnotes

1963 births
Living people
Hindustani singers
Singers from Mumbai
20th-century Indian male classical singers
Indian classical composers
Hindustani composers
21st-century Indian male classical singers